The George Perkins Marsh Boyhood Home, also known as the Marsh-Billings House, is the architectural centerpiece of Marsh-Billings-Rockefeller National Historical Park, on Vermont Route 12 in Woodstock, Vermont, United States.  The house, built in 1805 and enlarged several times, is historically significant as the boyhood home of George Perkins Marsh (1801–1882), an early conservationist, and as the home later in the 19th century of Frederick H. Billings (1823–1890), a businessman and philanthropist who was a cofounder of the Northern Pacific Railroad.  It is also architecturally significant as a high-quality example of Queen Anne architecture, alterations and enlargements commissioned by Billings and designed by Henry Hudson Holley.  The house and its surrounding gardens were declared a National Historic Landmark in 1967.  The  estate on which it stands was given by Mary French Rockefeller (the granddaughter of Frederick Billings) and Laurance Rockefeller to the people of the United States in 1992.

History
Charles Marsh, a prominent Vermont lawyer, built the core of the present house in 1805, as a fairly typical two-story five-bay Federal style house, and it is where he raised his family.  His son George Perkins Marsh was born elsewhere in Woodstock in 1801, and grew up here before leaving for Dartmouth College when he was sixteen.  The younger Marsh followed his father into both law and politics, winning election to Congress in 1834 as a Whig, and gaining appointment to diplomatic posts by Presidents John Tyler and Abraham Lincoln.  Between the 1830s and 1860s he developed a philosophy of land stewardship which laid the foundation for the conservation movement in the United States with the 1864 publication of Man and Nature, or the Physical Geography as Modified by Human Behavior.  This work, updated in 1874, gave a historical assessment of the decline of earlier societies because of a lack of stewardship, and made substantive calls for remedial actions to preserve the natural environment.  Marsh died in 1882, never seeing his ideas fully realized.

The Marsh estate, then , was purchased in 1869 by Frederick H. Billings, a native of Royalton, Vermont who made a fortune as a lawyer dealing with land claims during the California Gold Rush, and was one of the founding partners of the Northern Pacific Railroad, serving as its president from 1873 to 1881.  Between 1869 and 1881 Billings commissioned two significant enlargements and alterations to the house, the first adding a wing and a mansard roof, and the second, designed by Henry Hudson Holley, that fully transformed the building into the elaborate Queen Anne Victorian it is today.  Billings established what he considered to be a model farm on the property; this part of the estate is now a living history museum and working farm, adjacent to the national park.  Billings also constructed  of carriage roads through the upland sections of the estate.

The next major owners of the property were Mary French Rockefeller (Billings' granddaughter) and her husband Laurance Rockefeller.  The latter, an influential conservation advisor to several United States presidents, donated the house and upland properties to the people of the United States in 1992, the year the Marsh-Billings-Rockefeller National Historical Park was established.  The house and a surrounding  of land were designated a National Historic Landmark and listed on the National Register of Historic Places in 1967 for their association with Marsh and Billings, and for the house's architecture, which was judged a particularly fine and imposing example of Queen Anne architecture.  The house is open for guided tours between May and October; a fee is charged, and reservations may be made in advance, because tour size is limited.

See also
List of National Historic Landmarks in Vermont
National Register of Historic Places listings in Windsor County, Vermont

References

National Historic Landmarks in Vermont
1805 establishments in Vermont
Historic house museums in Vermont
Houses completed in 1805
Houses in Windsor County, Vermont
Houses on the National Register of Historic Places in Vermont
George Perkins Marsh
Buildings and structures in Woodstock, Vermont
National Register of Historic Places in Windsor County, Vermont
Historic district contributing properties in Vermont